Anto Antony Punnathaniyil
(born 1 May 1957) is a member of the 15th, 16th Lok Sabha from the Pathanamthitta electoral district in Kerala. 
He is a member of the Indian National Congress and on 16 May 2009, in the first election held in this newly apportioned district, he was elected as a United Democratic Front (UDF) candidate by 408,232 votes over K. Ananthagopan of the Communist Party of India (Marxist) with 297,026; B. Radhakrishna Menon of the Bharatiya Janata Party with 56,294 and three other candidates. In 2014 general elections, he was re-elected from the same constituency with a margin of 58,836 against LDF supported opponent independent candidate Mr. Peelipose Thomas, who was an ex DCC president.

For the 2019 General elections also, the Congress party has renominated Anto Antony to contest from Pathanamthitta LokSabha Constituency.

In 2004, he had lost in the Kottayam race to CPI(M) candidate K. Suresh Kurup, by 341,213 votes to his 298,299. He won Lok Sabha elections from Pathanamthitta in 2009, 2014 and 2019.

Background 
A native of Moonnilavu Panchayath in Pala assembly segment in  Kottayam district, he attended St. Thomas College, Pala; the Kerala Law Academy Law College, Thiruvananthapuram (affiliated to Kerala University); the Government Law College, Ernakulam, (under Mahatma Gandhi University); and the Rajagiri College of Social Sciences. He was general secretary of the Kerala Students Union.

References

External links 

Antony's campaign website
Anto Antony Web Site

Living people
Politicians from Kottayam
Indian National Congress politicians from Kerala
India MPs 2009–2014
1956 births
Lok Sabha members from Kerala
India MPs 2014–2019
People from Pathanamthitta district
India MPs 2019–present